The Equal Earth map projection is an equal-area pseudocylindrical projection for world maps, invented by Bojan Šavrič, Bernhard Jenny, and Tom Patterson in 2018. It is inspired by the widely used Robinson projection, but unlike the Robinson projection, retains the relative size of areas. The projection equations are simple to implement and fast to evaluate.

The features of the Equal Earth projection include: 
 The curved sides of the projection suggest the spherical form of Earth.
 Straight parallels make it easy to compare how far north or south places are from the equator.
 Meridians are evenly spaced along any line of latitude.
 Software for implementing the projection is easy to write and executes efficiently.

According to the creators, the projection was created in response to the decision of the Boston public schools to adopt the Gall-Peters projection for world maps in March 2017, to accurately show the relative sizes of equatorial and non-equatorial regions. The decision generated controversy in the world of cartography due to this projection’s extreme distortion in the polar regions. At that time Šavrič, Jenny, and Patterson sought alternative map projections of equal areas for world maps, but could not find any that met their aesthetic criteria. Therefore, they created a new projection that had more visual appeal compared to existing projections of equal areas.

As with the Natural Earth projection (2012) by Tom Patterson, a visual method was used to choose the parameters of the projection. A combination of Putniņš P4ʹ and Eckert IV projections was used as the basis.

Formulation

The projection is formulated as the equations

where

Use 

The first known thematic map published using the Equal Earth projection is a map of the global mean temperature anomaly for July 2018, produced by the NASA’s Goddard Institute for Space Studies.

References

External links 
 

Map projections